FRB may refer to:
 Fast radio burst in radio astronomy
 Fractional-reserve banking
 Fairbourne railway station, in Wales, station code
 Federal Reserve Board of Governors, in the United States
 Federal Reserve Bank
 Forbes Airport, New South Wales, Australia, IATA code
 Team Frøy–Bianchi, a Norwegian cycling team, code
 FKBP12-Rapamycin Binding domain; see Mechanistic target of rapamycin